René Verneau (25 April 1852 – 7 January 1938) was a French palaeoanthropologist. Among his work is the reconstruction of the Grimaldi man from Liguria, and study of the Guanches.

In 2005, the Mission laïque française college in Las Palmas de Gran Canaria, the only francophone college in the island, adopted his name.

References 
 "René Verneau."  In Biographical Dictionary of the History of Paleoanthropology. Edited by Matthew R. Goodrum. (2016) available at https://drive.google.com/file/d/12eUQV8XIIP0J4Q4hb2GgO5LQFdov_KhB/view

See also
 Palaeoanthropology on Muséum national d'Histoire naturelle

1852 births
1938 deaths
French anthropologists